Madison Gate Records, Inc. is an American record label owned by Sony Pictures Entertainment that specializes in soundtracks and other recordings derived from films, television programs, and other entertainment media.

History
Madison Gate Records is the most recent in a long line of record companies affiliated with Columbia Pictures (now a part of Sony Pictures Entertainment), beginning with Colpix Records in 1958 and including the Colgems Records, Bell Records and Arista Records labels. The label takes its name from the Madison Avenue gated entrance to Sony Pictures Studios in Culver City, California.  In 2013, Madison Gate Records swept the soundtrack category at the Grammy Awards, earning wins for both Best Compilation Soundtrack for Visual Media for the soundtrack from Midnight in Paris and Best Score Soundtrack For Visual Media for the soundtrack from The Girl with the Dragon Tattoo.

Artists
The a cappella group Pentatonix, who were the grand prizewinner in Season 3 of NBC's The Sing-Off, was signed exclusively to Madison Gate Records prior to signing with RCA Records in May 2014.

Discography

Soundtracks

Artist albums

Charting albums

Awards

Grammy Awards

Academy Awards

References

External links
 
 Official YouTube Channel

Companies based in Los Angeles
American independent record labels
Alternative rock record labels
Soundtrack record labels
Sony Pictures Entertainment